G is the fourth studio album by the American singer Gerald Levert. It was originally scheduled to be released via EastWest Records on September 21, 1999, under the title Same 'Ol G, but was pushed back to March 7, 2000. The album peaked at number two on the US Top R&B/Hip-Hop Albums and at number 8 on the Billboard 200.

Track listing

Charts

Weekly charts

Year-end charts

Certifications

References

1999 albums
Albums with cover art by Tony Duran
Gerald Levert albums
East West Records albums